Sarab-e Dowreh (also Romanized as Sarāb-e Dowreh, Sarāb Dowrah, Sarāb Dowreh, and Sarāb-e Do Rah; also known as Sarāb Darreh and Sarāb Doreh) is a city in and capital of Dowreh County, Lorestan Province, Iran. At the 2006 census, its population was 1,312, in 326 families.

References

Towns and villages in Dowreh County
Cities in Lorestan Province
Kurdish settlements in Iran